No One Ever Tells You is the third studio album by American actor and singer Seth MacFarlane. The album was released on September 30, 2015 through Republic Records. The album features Frank Sinatra's bassist Chuck Berghofer as well as a 65-piece orchestra. The album is the follow-up to MacFarlane's 2014 Christmas album Holiday for Swing. Like his two previous albums, No One Ever Tells You was produced and conducted by film and television composer Joel McNeely. The album earned MacFarlane a Grammy Award nomination for Best Traditional Pop Vocal Album.

Background 
The album was recorded during the summer of 2015 in Studio 2 at Abbey Road Studios in London. The album was recorded during MacFarlane's promotional tour of Ted 2. On what attracted him about making this kind of album, MacFarlane stated, "There was a time during the mid-1950s and early 1960s when popular song was stretching its creative boundaries, and experimenting with more ambitious structures and tones. During this period, a song set out to really tell a story: not just with the lyric and the vocal, but with the arrangements and orchestral interpretations. The songs on this record attempt to do just that." Joel McNeely said about the music of the album, "The instrumentation on this record is unusual. It is a very small string section, only a few brass and woodwinds. But we chose the musicians very carefully. These players have an understanding of the long lost style of playing from that era and their understanding of the required extra vibrato, copious dramatic slides and bends brings a stylistic realism to the orchestra almost impossible to achieve these days." MacFarlane has initially described the album as being in the style of Frank Sinatra's album In the Wee Small Hours. The album's cover art reflects this.

Critical reception 

No One Ever Tells You has received mostly positive acclaim from music critics. At Music Times, they commented that "He certainly embodied the style and swagger of Sinatra."

Daily News' Kirthana Ramisetti  praised the album, commenting "MacFarlane channeled his Sinatra for this album." JazzTimes Christopher Loudon praised the album by saying "Backed by a wall of brass and a sea of strings, MacFarlane again succeeds admirably—as does McNeely, whose charts estimably echo Nelson Riddle and Gordon Jenkins. While he lacks Sinatra’s raw emotional wallop and more closely mirrors the mellow warmth of Dean Martin, he is no poseur. There’s plenty here from the Sinatra canon." A Plus said the following about the album, "While Music was largely upbeat, the melodies in No One are slow and sad in the best possible way. It's the kind of album where the orchestra wraps you up and indulges your sorrow while the nuances in his voice break your heart completely."

Track listing

Credits and personnel
Credits are adapted from the album's liner notes.

Musicians

Seth MacFarlane – lead vocals, piano
Jennifer Barnes – vocals (background)
Dan Bates – cor anglais, oboe
Chuck Berghofer – bass
Mark Berrow – violin
Richard Berry – French horn
Ishani Bhoola – violin
Dave Bishop – B-flat clarinet, flute, flute (alto), sax (tenor)
Richard Bissill – French horn
Nigel Black – French horn
Graeme Blevins – B-flat clarinet, flute, flute (alto), sax (alto), sax (soprano)
John Bradbury – violin
Gordon Campbell – trombone (tenor)
Emil Chakalov – violin
Reiad Chibah – viola
Chris Cowie – cor anglais, oboe
Dave Daniels – celli
Tim Davis – vocal contractor, vocals (background)
Caroline Dearnley – celli
Alison Dods – violin
Phillip Eastop – French horn
Dai Emanuel – violin
Matt Skelton – drums
Andrew Gathercole – flugelhorn, trumpet
Richard George – violin
Tim Gill – celli
Adam Goldsmith – guitar (acoustic)
Missi Hale – vocals (background)
David Hartley – celeste, piano
Andrew Haveron – leader, violin
John Heley – celli
Ian Humphries – violin
Magnus Johnston – leader, violin
Karen Jones – flute
Skaila Kanga – harp
Patrick Kiernan – violin
Liam Kirkman – trombone (tenor)
Julia Knight – viola
Teri Eiko Koide – vocals (background)
Boguslaw Kostecki – violin
David Loucks – vocals (background)
Mike Lovatt – flugelhorn, trumpet
Jim Lynch – flugelhorn, trumpet
Rita Manning – violin
Danny Marsden – flugelhorn, trumpet
Eliza Marshall – flute
Howard McGill – B-flat clarinet, flute, flute (alto), sax (tenor)
Steve Morris – violin
Nick Moss – B-flat clarinet, flute, flute (alto), sax (tenor)
Kate Musker – viola
Everton Nelson – leader, violin
Mark Nightingale – trombone (tenor)
Andy Panayi – B-flat clarinet, flute, flute (alto), sax (alto), sax (soprano)
John Parricelli – guitar (acoustic)
Alan Pasqua – piano
Camilla Pay – harp
David Pyatt – French horn
Frank Ricotti – percussion
Tom Rizzo – guitar (acoustic)
Martin Robertson – B-flat clarinet, clarinet (bass), flute, sax (baritone)
Jackie Shave – leader, violin
Emlyn Singleton – violin
Colin Skinner – B-flat clarinet, clarinet (bass), flute, sax (baritone)
Sonia Slany – violin
Jamie Talbot – B-flat clarinet, flute, flute (alto), sax (alto), sax (soprano)
Cathy Thompson – violin
Phil Todd – B-flat clarinet, flute, flute (alto), sax (alto), sax (soprano)
Chris Tombling – violin
Bozidar Vukotic – celli
Vicci Wardman – viola
Richard Watkins – French horn
Bruce White – viola
Pat White – flugelhorn, trumpet
Rolf Wilson – violin
Andy Wood – trombone (bass)
Richard Wigley - trombone

Production

Joel McNeely – arranger, conductor, liner notes, producer
Jonathan Allen – engineer
Rich Breen – Engineer, mixing
Joy Fehily – executive producer
Mark Graham – music preparation
Isobel Griffiths – contracting
Dave Hage – librarian
JoAnn Kane – music preparation
Dave Collins – mastering
Matthew Peak – illustrations

Charts
No One Ever Tells You debuted at No. 1 on the US Billboard Top Jazz Albums.

Release history

References

2015 albums
Albums produced by Joel McNeely
Big band albums
Covers albums
Easy listening albums
Seth MacFarlane albums
Republic Records albums